Narimanov is a town and the administrative center of Narimanovsky District in Astrakhan Oblast, Russia, located on the western bank of the Volga River,  northwest from Astrakhan, the administrative center of the oblast. Population:    3,400 (1979).

History
Originally known as the selo of Nizhnevolzhskoye, it was granted urban-type settlement status and renamed Nizhnevolzhsk in 1967. In 1984, it was granted town status and renamed Narimanov, after the Azerbaijani Soviet revolutionary Nariman Narimanov.

Administrative and municipal status
Within the framework of administrative divisions, Narimanov serves as the administrative center of Narimanovsky District. As an administrative division, it is incorporated within Narimanovsky District as the town of district significance of Narimanov. As a municipal division, the town of district significance of Narimanov is incorporated within Narimanovsky Municipal District as Narimanov Urban Settlement.

Economy
The town is home to the Lotus shipyard. In addition to building and repairing ships, the shipyard also builds block modules for large constructions for floating oil production platforms (oil rigs).

References

Notes

Sources

External links
Mojgorod.ru. Entry on Narimanov 

Cities and towns in Astrakhan Oblast